The 2022 J2 League, also known as the  for sponsorship reasons, was the 24th season of the J2 League, the second-tier Japanese professional league for association football clubs, since its establishment in 1999.

Clubs

Personnel and kits

Managerial changes

Foreign players
As of 2022 season, there are no more restrictions on a number of signed foreign players, but clubs can only register up to five foreign players for a single match-day squad. Players from J.League partner nations (Thailand, Vietnam, Myanmar, Malaysia, Cambodia, Singapore, Indonesia and Qatar) are exempt from these restrictions.

Players name in bold indicates the player is registered during the midseason transfer window.
Player's name in italics indicates the player has Japanese nationality in addition to their FIFA nationality, or is exempt from being treated as a foreign player due to having been born in Japan and being enrolled in, or having graduated from school in the country.

League table

Promotion–relegation playoffs

Results table

Season statistics

Goal contributions

Top scorers

Top assists

Clean sheets

Discipline

Player
Most yellow cards: 9
  Kota Fukatsu (Machida Zelvia)

 Most red cards: 2 
  Carlos Gutiérrez (Tochigi SC)

Club
 Most yellow cards: 67  (Iwate Grulla Morioka)
 Most red cards: 4 (Mito HollyHock)

Awards

Monthly awards

See also
Japan Football Association (JFA)
2022 Nadeshiko League
2022 Blaublitz Akita season
2022 Mito HollyHock season
2022 Vegalta Sendai season

References

External links
 Official website on jleague.co 

J2 League
2
Japan